A Chang–Refsdal lens is a point-mass gravitational lens (e.g. black hole) perturbed by constant external shear.

The name derives from Kyongae Chang and Sjur Refsdal who in 1979 published a paper in NATURE 282, 561. "Flux Variations of QSO Q0957+561 A,B and image splitting by stars Near the Light Path."
The paper illustrated that stars could affect quasar image brightness.

See also

 Microlensing
 MACHO
 Quasar

References 

Gravitational lensing